Snoopy vs. the Red Baron is a flight combat game released on the PlayStation 2, PlayStation Portable, and PC in 2006. As the name implies, the protagonist is Snoopy, the dog in Charles M. Schulz's comic strip, Peanuts. The game is based on Snoopy's alter ego as a World War I flying ace, battling against Manfred von Richthofen, the Red Baron, the Flying Circus: Jagdgeschwader 1, the Austro-Hungarian Empire, and other enemies of the war.

This is the first Peanuts game released on a Sony platform and the second overall Peanuts game based on Snoopy's ace pilot fantasies, after Snoopy and the Red Baron. It was followed in 2010 by Snoopy Flying Ace.

Reception

The PSP version received "generally favorable reviews", while the PlayStation 2 and PC versions received "average" reviews according to video game review aggregator Metacritic.

References

External links
 Namco Bandai Games website
 

2006 video games
Bandai Namco games
Video games based on Peanuts
North America-exclusive video games
PlayStation Portable games
PlayStation 2 games
Video games developed in the United States
Video games scored by Lennie Moore
Windows games
World War I video games
Cultural depictions of Manfred von Richthofen
Video games set in the 1910s
Flight simulation video games
Video games about dogs